The Archduchy of Austria was a major principality of the Holy Roman Empire and the nucleus of the Habsburg monarchy. With its capital at Vienna, the archduchy was centered at the Empire's southeastern periphery.

Its present name originates from the Frankish term Oustrich – Eastern Kingdom (east of the Frankish kingdom). The archduchy developed out of the Bavarian Margraviate of Austria, elevated to the Duchy of Austria according to the 1156 Privilegium Minus by Emperor Frederick Barbarossa. The House of Habsburg came to the Austrian throne in Vienna in 1282 and in 1453 Emperor Frederick III, also the ruler of Austria, officially adopted the archducal title. From the 15th century onwards, all Holy Roman Emperors but one were Austrian archdukes and with the acquisition of the Bohemian and Hungarian crown lands in 1526, the Habsburg hereditary lands became the centre of a major European power.

The archduchy's history as an imperial state ended with the dissolution of the Holy Roman Empire in 1806. It was replaced with the Lower and Upper Austria crown lands of the Austrian Empire.

Geography

Located in the Danube basin, the ancient Roman province Pannonia Superior, Austria bordered on the Kingdom of Hungary beyond the March and Leitha rivers in the east. In the south it was confined by the Duchy of Styria, with the border at the historic Semmering Pass, while in the north the Bohemian Forest and the Thaya river marked the border with Bohemia and Moravia.

In the west, the Upper Austrian part bordered on the Bavarian stem duchy. The adjacent Innviertel region belonged to the Bavarian dukes, until it was occupied by Austrian forces during the War of the Bavarian Succession in 1778 and incorporated into the archducal lands according to the Peace of Teschen. In the course of the German mediatisation in 1803, the Austrian archdukes also acquired the rule over the Electorate of Salzburg and the Berchtesgaden Provostry.

History

After Austria was detached from Bavaria and established as an Imperial estate in 1156 (thanks to the Privilegium Minus), the Babenberg dukes also acquired the neighbouring Duchy of Styria in 1192. After the extinction of male line in 1246 and the subsequent quarter-century reign by King Ottokar II of Bohemia – a permanent vestige of his rule is the division of Austria proper into Upper and Lower Austria (at the time called "Austria above the Enns" and "below the Enns") – it was seized by the Habsburg king Rudolf I of Germany, who defeated Ottokar in the Battle on the Marchfeld (1278) and later (1282) enfeoffed his sons Albert I and Rudolf II with both duchies.

In 1358/59 the Habsburg duke Rudolf IV, in response to the Golden Bull of 1356, already claimed the archducal title by forging the Privilegium Maius. Rudolf aimed to achieve a status comparable to the Empire's seven prince-electors, the holders of the traditional Imperial 'arch'-offices (cf. Archchancellor); however, his attempts failed as the elevation was rejected by the Luxembourg emperor Charles IV (Rudolf's father-in-law). Rudolf's younger brothers Albert III and Leopold III divided the Habsburg lands by the 1379 Treaty of Neuberg, whereafter the Austrian duchy itself remained under the rule of the Albertinian line.

From duchy to archduchy
On Epiphany 1453 Emperor Frederick III, regent of Austria for his minor Albertinian cousin Ladislaus the Posthumous, finally acknowledged the archducal title. It was then conferred to all Habsburg emperors and rulers, as well as to the non-ruling princes of the dynasty, however, it still did not carry the right to vote in the Imperial election.

Frederick further promoted the rise of the Habsburg dynasty into European dimensions with the arrangement of the marriage between his son Maximilian I and Mary the Rich, heiress of Burgundy in 1477. After Maximilian's son Philip the Handsome in 1496 had married Joanna the Mad, Queen of Castile and the Crown of Aragon, his son Charles V could come into an inheritance "on which the sun never sets".

Nevertheless, Charles' younger brother Ferdinand I claimed his rights and became Archduke of Austria according to an estate distribution at the 1521 Diet of Worms, whereby he became regent over the Austrian archduchy and the adjacent Inner Austrian lands of Styria, Carinthia, Carniola and Gorizia (Görz). By marrying Princess Anna of Bohemia and Hungary, Ferdinand inherited both kingdoms in 1526. Also King of the Romans from 1531, he became the progenitor of the Austrian branch of the House of Habsburg (Habsburg-Lorraine from 1740/45 on), which as Archdukes of Austria and Kings of Bohemia ruled as Holy Roman Emperors until the Empire's dissolution in 1806.

Austrian Empire
In 1804, Emperor Francis II of Habsburg who was also ruler of the lands of the Habsburg monarchy promoted his territories within the Holy Roman Empire together with his Kingdom of Hungary to the Austrian Empire in reaction to Napoleon I's proclamation of the French Empire; two years later Francis formally dissolved the Holy Roman Empire. The Archduchy of Austria continued to exist as a constituent crown land (Kronland) within the empire, although it was divided into Upper and Lower Austria for administrative purposes. (Hungary preserved its earlier status as Regnum Independens.) The title of archduke continued to be used by members of the imperial family and the archduchy was only formally dissolved in 1918 with the collapse of Austria-Hungary and the creation of the separate federal states of Lower and Upper Austria in the new Republic of German Austria.

See also
 History of Austria
 List of rulers of Austria

References

 
Medieval Austria
Early Modern Austria
Austria
Austrian Circle
Historical regions in Austria
1453 establishments in Europe
Archduchy of Austria
Archduchy of Austria
Austria
1918 disestablishments in Austria-Hungary
Disestablishments in the Empire of Austria (1867–1918)
Lands of the Empire of Austria (1867–1918)
Former monarchies of Europe
1806 disestablishments in Austria